Angus V. McIver (April 29, 1892 – July 24, 1974) was an American architect who designed many buildings in the state of Montana.

Early life
McIver was born on April 29, 1892, in Great Falls, Montana, at age 82. He graduated from the University of Michigan in 1915.

Career
McIver became an architect in Great Falls, Montana in 1915, when he co-founded the firm of Mclver, Cohagen and Marshall with Chandler C. Cohagen and Walter V. Marshall. He served in the United States Army during World War I in 1917–1919. From 1919 to 1936, he was a partner in McIver & Cohagen. He was a partner in McIver, Hess & Haugsjaa from 1950 to 1959, and in McIver & Hess until 1969. Over the course of his career, McIver designed many churches, hospitals and schools, as well as the courthouses of Toole County, Glacier County and Pondera County. Among his major works is the Montana Veterans and Pioneers Memorial Building in Helena, built from 1950 to 1953 and listed on the National Register of Historic Places in 2004.

Cohagen was a fellow of the American Institute of Architects.

Personal life and death
McIver was married twice. He first married Loneta E. Kuhn in 1915, and she died in 1959. He married Valborg Ryan in 1966. He had a daughter. He was a Freemason.

McIver died on July 24, 1974, in Great Falls.

Architectural works
 First Presbyterian Church (former), 1180 Cedar St, Forsyth, Montana (1920, NRHP 1990)
 Garfield School, 3212 First Ave S, Billings, Montana (1920, NRHP 2013)
 Rosebud County Deaconess Hospital (former). 281 N Seventeenth Ave, Forsyth, Montana (1920-21, NRHP 1979)
 Hardin Primary School, 314 3rd St, Hardin, Montana (1921)
 Montana Odd Fellows Home (former), 2245 Head Ln, Helena, Montana (1927-28)
 United States Post Office and Courthouse additions, 2602 First Ave N, Billings, Montana (1932, NRHP 1986)
 Toole County Courthouse, 226 1st St S, Shelby, Montana (1933-34)
 Pondera County Courthouse, 20 Fourth Ave SW, Conrad, Montana (1937-38)
 Glacier County Courthouse, 512 E Main St, Cut Bank, Montana (1938-39, NRHP 2013)
 Montana Veterans and Pioneers Memorial Building, 225 N Roberts St, Helena, Montana (1950-53, NRHP 2004)

Gallery of architectural works

Notes

References

1892 births
1974 deaths
People from Great Falls, Montana
University of Michigan alumni
Architects from Montana
United States Army personnel of World War I
20th-century American architects